Kuandian Manchu Autonomous County (Mölendroff: kuwandiyan manju beye dasangga siyan), is a county of eastern Liaoning province, China, bordering North Korea to the southeast and Jilin in the northeast. In Kuandian is the Hushan Great Wall, the most easterly section of the Great Wall of China. A short reconstruction of the wall is open to tourists. The area has an abandoned airstrip that was used by the Chinese airforce during the Korean War.

As of 2009, the county's population was 434,900 people.

History 
The area of present-day Kuandian belonged to the Yan state during the Warring States period, and was then brought under the Liaodong Commandery in the Qin Dynasty.

From the Eastern Han Dynasty until 408 CE, the southern part of the county was incorporated under the rule of various Chinese dynasties. The area became part of Goguryeo in 408 CE, and afterwards became part of the Tang Dynasty's Protectorate General to Pacify the East.

The county's name originates from the Kingdom of Balhae, when the area was known as Kuandianzi.

The area would come under the reign of the Liao dynasty, then the Jin dynasty, and then the Yuan dynasty.

In 1467, the Ming Dynasty built a defensive wall in the eastern part of the region that terminated at the Yalu River. Various forts were added in 1546 and 1573.

Kuandian County was established in 1876 under Fenghuang Ting. The area belonged to  during the early days of the Republic of China.

The county was put under the jurisdiction of the prefecture-level city of Dandong in 1965. Kuandian County was approved as an autonomous county in September 1989, becoming the Kuandian Manchu Autonomous County.

Administrative divisions
There are 19 towns, 2 townships and 1 ethnic township in the county.

Towns 

Townships 

Xialuhe Korean Ethnic Township 
Xialuhe Korean Ethnic Township is the county's sole ethnic township.

Geography
Kuandian occupies the eastern half of Dandong City and is situated among the Changbai Mountains, on the northwest (right) bank of middle-lower reaches of the Yalu River, across which it borders the North Korean provinces of North Pyongan and Chagang. Domestically, it borders Ji'an (Jilin) to the northeast, Fengcheng to the west, Benxi to the northwest, and Huanren County to the north.

Climate 
Kuandian has a monsoon-influenced humid continental climate (Köppen Dwa) characterised by very warm, humid summers, due to the monsoon, and long, cold, and very dry winters, due to the Siberian anticyclone. The four seasons here are distinctive. A majority of the annual rainfall occurs in July and August. Due to the mountainous location, temperatures tend to be cooler, and summer rainfall is heavier. The average relative humidity is 71%, and the frost-free period is 140 days.

Demographics

Ethnic groups 
The county is majority Manchu as of 2002.

Historic population 

Population censuses in the county have been undertaken since 1907. The county's population has declined since its peak of 444,609 people in 1991.

Urbanization 
During the People's Republic of China, the county's urban population, and proportion of people living in urban environments has grown significantly. In 1949, the year the People's Republic of China was proclaimed, 1.8% of the county's population lived in urban areas. By 1953, this rose to 4.0%. In 1982, 9.2% of the county's population lived in urban areas, which rose to 15.3% by 1985, 23.8% by 1991, and 25.5% by 1995. At 2005, 23.7% of the county's population lived in rural areas.

Economy 
Kuandian's mineral deposits include boron, iron, lead, zinc, coal, copper, magnesite, and talc. The county's boron output accounts for about 50% of China's total, and the area is sometimes called "boron sea".

Transport 
National Highway 201 passes through the county.

Notable people
Yu Zhenwu (born 1931) - pilot
Tian Xueren (born 1947) - politician
Zhang Jiehui (born 1957) - politician
Zhang Shaochun (born 1958) - politician
Zhu Yuchen (born 1961) - business executive
Wang Qiang (1975-2005) - serial killer
He Xiangyu (born 1986) - contemporary artist

References

County-level divisions of Liaoning
Manchu autonomous counties